Princess Nakatsu, also known as Nakatsu-hime no Mikoto, is a figure in Japanese mythology and the consort of Emperor Ōjin and the mother of Emperor Nintoku.

History
There are few known episodes of Princess Nakatsu's life, but she is venerated as a goddess at Hachiman Shrine.

Princess Nakatsu was the daughter of Hondamawaka no Ō (also known as Hondamawaka no Mikoto), a descendant of the emperor Kōshō and her mother was Kana-taya hime. Princess Nakatsu was the sister of Takano-iri hime and Otohime. She married Ōjin and had two children, Arata-hime no Mikoto and Emperor Nintoku.

Princess Nakatsu is believed to have become empress consort to Emperor Ōjin in the 2nd year of his reign. According to the Nihon Shoki, her sisters Takano-iri hime and Otohime also became consorts of Emperor Ōjin. This was a common practice during this period for sisters to be consorts of the emperor. 

After the death of Emperor Ōjin, Princess Nakatsu became empress dowager and the mother of the new emperor, Emperor Nintoku.

The tomb of Princess Nakatsu is believed to be located in Nakatsu-yama no Misasagi, Nara prefecture.

References

Japanese empresses
Japanese goddesses
Japanese princesses